Bhanupriya (born Mangabhanu; 15 January 1967) is an Indian actress, Kuchipudi dancer, and voice artiste. In a career spanning over 4 decades, Bhanupriya has appeared in 155 feature films- predominantly in Telugu & Tamil, in addition to occasional performances in Malayalam, Kannada and Hindi films. She has starred in a variety of roles, ranging from slapstick comedy to epic dramas. She has won three state Nandi Awards, two Tamil Nadu State Film Awards, two Filmfare Awards South and two Cinema Express Awards.

Early life
Bhanupriya was born on 15 January 1967 in Rangampeta village near Rajahmundry, Andhra Pradesh in a Telugu-speaking family, to Pandu Babu and Ragamali. She was named as Mangabhanu. Her family later moved to Chennai, Tamil Nadu. She has an elder brother Gopikrishana and a younger sister Shantipriya, who has also been a film actress since the 1990s.

Career 
She was one of the top mainstream actresses for more than a decade from 1983 to 1995. She made her acting debut with the Tamil film Mella Pesungal (1983). She then appeared in the Telugu hit Sitaara, which won the National Film Award for Best Feature Film in Telugu for that year. She then played an ornithologist in the 1985 mystery film Anveshana. In 1986, she made her Hindi film debut with Dosti Dushmani. In 1988, she appeared in Swarnakamalam, which was screened at the Indian panorama section of the 1988 International Film Festival of India and the Ann Arbor Film Festival. Bhanupriya received the Indian Express Award for Best Actress, the Nandi Award for Best Actress, and the Filmfare Award for Best Actress – Telugu for her performance in the film. In 1989 and 1991, her performances in the Tamil hits Aararo Aariraro, and Azhagan brought her the Tamil Nadu State Film Award Special Prizes, respectively. She received the JFW Divas of South India Award for her contribution to South Indian cinema, the Gemini TV Puraskaram for lifetime achievement in television and various other honors.

Personal life
Bhanupriya married Adarsh Kaushal, a digital graphics engineer, at the Sri Venkateswara temple in Malibu, California, on 14 June 1998. The couple has a daughter, Abhinaya, born in 2002. Bhanupriya returned to India, and resumed her acting career. She lives in Chennai with her daughter. Kaushal died in 2018 after suffering a cardiac arrest.

Filmography

Film

Acting roles

Dubbing artist
 Urmila Matondkar - Indian (Tamil movie) (1996), Sathya (Telugu) (1998)
 Priya Raman - Suryavamsam (1997)
 Rambha - Arunachalam (Telugu movie) (1997)
 Nivedita Jain - Thayin Manikodi (1998)

Television

Awards

Nandi Awards
 Best Actress - Swarna Kamalam (1988)
 Best Character Actress - Lahiri Lahiri Lahirilo (2002)
 Best Supporting Actress - Chatrapati (2005)

Filmfare Awards South
 Best Actress - Telugu in 1988 for her performance in Swarna Kamalam
 Best Actress - Tamil in 1989 for her performance in Aararo Aaariraro

Other Awards
 Tamil Nadu State Film Award Special Prize in 1989 for the film Aararo Aaariraro
 Tamil Nadu State Film Award Special Prize in 1991 for the film Azhagan
 Cinema Express Awards in 1996 for the film Peddarayudu
 Screen Videocon Award for the television serial Shakti.
 JFW Divas of South - Awarded on 12 October 2012 by Just for Women magazine for her contribution to south Indian cinema.

References

External links

 

Living people
20th-century Indian actresses
Actresses in Telugu cinema
Indian film actresses
Actresses from Andhra Pradesh
Actresses in Kannada cinema
Actresses in Malayalam cinema
Actresses in Tamil cinema
Nandi Award winners
Actresses from Rajahmundry
Telugu actresses
Kuchipudi exponents
21st-century Indian actresses
Performers of Indian classical dance
Actresses in Hindi cinema
Indian voice actresses
Women artists from Andhra Pradesh
Singers from Andhra Pradesh
Dancers from Andhra Pradesh
Indian female classical dancers
20th-century Indian women singers
20th-century Indian singers
Actresses in Telugu television
Actresses in Tamil television
Actresses in Hindi television
1967 births